"Anastasia" is the theme song of the 1956 20th Century Fox moving picture Anastasia. It is written by Paul Francis Webster and Alfred Newman.

Pat Boone recorded his version on November 10, 1956. Soon it was released as a single (Dot 45-15521, with "Don't Forbid Me" on the flip side.) Billboard wrote in its December 1 review: "Many versions of the theme of the Ingrid Bergman starrer are reported, but it will take something very unusual to surpass Boone's suave styling of this lovely, dreamy tune. His long line of hits is not likely to be broken, particularly since the flip also is strong" and two weeks later added: "Boone has a two-sided powerhouse here that has been clicking from the word "Go." Upon delivery, every major market has reported immediate take-off. "Don't Forbid Me" is the preferred side. but only by a little. "Anastasia" is leading rival versions of the tune by a considerable margin." The song reached number 37 in the United States.

Track listing

Charts 
"Don't Forbid Me" / "Anastasia"

References 

1956 songs
Pat Boone songs
Dot Records singles
Songs with music by Alfred Newman
Songs with lyrics by Paul Francis Webster